David Goodwillie (born 28 March 1989) is a Scottish professional footballer.

Goodwillie came through the Dundee United youth system and he won the SPFA and SFWA Young Player of the Year awards for the 2010–11 season. His performances with United earned him selection for the Scotland national team and a £2 million move to Blackburn Rovers, who were then in the English Premier League.  He was loaned to Crystal Palace, Dundee United and Blackpool, and released by Blackburn in 2014, after which he signed with Aberdeen. After a loan spell with Ross County, Goodwillie moved to Plymouth Argyle in 2016. He left Plymouth in January 2017.

Goodwillie has been convicted of assaults three times, committed in 2008, 2009 and 2010. In 2011 he was accused of raping a woman with his team-mate David Robertson. In a civil case in 2016, he was found to have raped her and ordered to pay £100,000 in compensation. Goodwillie resumed his career in the Scottish leagues with Clyde. After over four years there, he signed for Raith Rovers in January 2022. A negative reaction to his signing led to the club declaring he would not play for them, and he was released from his contract in September 2022. He has since played once for both Livingston United and Radcliffe.

Club career

Early career
Goodwillie was playing as a youth for Carse Thistle in his native Stirling before joining Dundee United as a 14-year-old in 2003, being spotted playing in a Scottish Youth FA trial in Dundee. In signing from Carse Thistle, Goodwillie followed in the footsteps of Duncan Ferguson who also played for the Stirling-based boys club. In July 2005, Goodwillie played for the first team in the pre-season City of Discovery Cup, appearing as a 77th-minute substitute in the tournament win.

Dundee United (first spell)
He signed professional forms with United in March 2005. On 31 December 2005, Goodwillie made his competitive debut for United, appearing as a late substitute in the defeat to Rangers at Ibrox. On 4 March 2006, in his fifth appearance for United, Goodwillie came off the bench to score a late goal for United against Hibernian at Easter Road. Goodwillie made ten substitute appearances for the United first team during the 2005–06 season, with the majority coming in the final few minutes of each match.

In October 2006, Goodwilie signed a new contract until May 2010 and started his first match for the club, against Falkirk. Goodwillie started twice more under new manager Craig Levein in the following two months, due to the injuries of other strikers. Following signings made in the January transfer window, he found himself largely an unused substitute for the remainder of the 2006–07 season, featuring just six times after New Year.

Goodwillie made two substitute appearances at the start of 2007–08 season, then joined Scottish Second Division side Raith Rovers on a two-month loan in November 2007, which was subsequently extended until the end of the season. Goodwillie scored nine goals in 21 league appearances for the Kirkcaldy side.

He featured for Dundee United in the early rounds of the 2008–09 League Cup, scoring three times against lower league sides. He added to his solitary SPL goal in the latter stages of the 2008–09 season, scoring a last-minute equaliser against Hibernian at Tannadice, then netting again against Hibernian later that season and also against Aberdeen. In September 2009 Goodwillie was arrested after a nightclub doorman was knocked unconscious. Two months later, Goodwillie received a £200 fine for his part in the incident. Dundee United manager Peter Houston placed Goodwillie under a "house arrest" scheme to avoid further trouble.

In the 2009–10 season, Goodwillie began as a regular starter for United, scoring three goals in the first five matches of the season. Notching twelve goals by mid-April, Goodwillie's performances were recognised with the Scottish Premier League Young Player of the Year award. In May 2010, Goodwillie scored the opening goal as United won the 2010 Scottish Cup Final by 3–0 against Ross County.

Goodwillie scored in six consecutive league games early in the 2010–11 season, prompting United chairman Stephen Thompson to say any other club would have to pay £3 million to sign him. Goodwillie signed a one-year extension to his contract with United in March 2011. Two days after signing an extension to his contract, Goodwillie scored the winning goal for United against Rangers at Ibrox. His performances were rewarded with the SPFA Young Player of the Year award for 2010–11.

Championship side Cardiff City, opened talks with Dundee United about transferring Goodwillie on 23 June 2011. The following day, United received bids from Rangers and Blackburn Rovers, both of which were rejected. On 31 July 2011, Blackburn Rovers and Dundee United agreed a fee for Goodwillie with an upfront fee of £2 million plus £800,000 in clauses, giving the striker permission to discuss terms with the Lancashire club.

Blackburn Rovers
Goodwillie signed for Blackburn Rovers on a four-year contract on 3 August 2011. On his arrival at the club manager Steve Kean likened the striker to "a young Wayne Rooney".

Six months after Goodwillie had moved to Blackburn, Dundee United received the payment for the player. Dundee United contacted the Scottish Premier League for assistance after Blackburn missed the deadline for the payment. The money, due for 13 February did not appear until 11 days after the scheduled date, with a later payment of £250,000 rescheduled for 1 March.

On 6 August 2011, Goodwillie scored a debut goal on a 76th minutes for Rovers in a friendly against Kilmarnock which Blackburn won 4–1. He made his competitive debut for the club on 13 August, on the opening day of the 2011–12 season, against Wolverhampton Wanderers at Ewood Park, replacing Morten Gamst Pedersen in the 72nd minute in a 2–1 defeat, and scored his first competitive goal in the 3–1 win over Sheffield Wednesday in the second round of the League Cup. In January 2012, Goodwillie scored his first Premier League goal at home to Stoke City. This was followed up five days later with his first FA Cup goal away to Newcastle United. Again in January, Goodwillie scored his second goal in the Premier League at away to Everton in a 1–1 draw.

On 31 August 2012 Goodwillie signed on loan at Championship side Crystal Palace until January 2013. However, he cut his loan spell short in mid-October after featuring in very few games, with the Eagles' Assistant Manager Lennie Lawrence stating that Goodwillie had "struggled to settle in London".

Dundee United (second spell)
Goodwillie returned to Dundee United on 2 July 2013 on a six-month loan deal until 13 January 2014. He scored a hat-trick in a 4–1 win against Partick Thistle in the 2013–14 Scottish League Cup on 25 September. Goodwillie scored the fourth goal in a 4–1 win against Kilmarnock in December 2013, which extended a run of United scoring four or more goals in a game. On 12 January 2014, Dundee United chairman Stephen Thompson confirmed the club would not be extending his loan deal, stating that the decision was not budget related but "much to do with what he's done since he came back, it's been a bit of a disappointment." Goodwillie scored six goals in 22 appearances in his return to Dundee United.

Blackpool (loan)
Goodwillie joined Blackpool, under the caretaker managership of Barry Ferguson, on 24 January 2014 on loan until the end of the season. Returning to Blackburn, he left the club by mutual consent on 20 June, with one year remaining on his contract.

Aberdeen
Goodwillie signed a one-year contract with Aberdeen in July 2014. On 17 July, he made his debut, coming on as a substitute against FC Groningen in the Europa League second qualifying round first leg. On 13 September, he scored his first goal for the Dons in a 2–1 defeat away to Celtic in the Scottish Premiership. On 21 January 2015, having scored five goals and established himself in the first team, Goodwillie signed another one-year contract keeping him at Pittodrie until the summer of 2016.

On 1 February 2016, Goodwillie moved to fellow Scottish Premiership club Ross County on loan until the end of the 2015–16 season. He made nine appearances as the Highland club came 6th, scoring a late equaliser in a 1–1 draw at Heart of Midlothian on 7 May.

Plymouth Argyle
On 29 June 2016, Goodwillie signed for EFL League Two club Plymouth Argyle. Affectionately known by the Argyle supporters as "Rupert Badcock", Goodwillie left Plymouth by mutual consent in January 2017, after a civil case concluded that he had raped a woman. A club statement said that Goodwillie had requested to leave as he was considering an appeal. Goodwillie scored one goal in 22 appearances for Plymouth. His one goal was on his final appearance, concluding a 4–2 home win over Stevenage on 17 January.

Clyde
Returning to Scotland, Goodwillie briefly played for Caledonian Amateur League team Doune Castle. In March 2017, he joined Scottish League Two side Clyde on a short-term contract until the end of the 2016–17 season. Clyde's decision to sign Goodwillie attracted criticism, as politician John Mason said he would no longer attend their games for the rest of the season. Goodwillie made his debut for Clyde against Cowdenbeath on 1 April, coming on as a 66th-minute substitute for Peter MacDonald. On 15 April, Goodwillie scored a hat-trick for Clyde in a 3–2 win against Elgin City.

He received a hat-trick of personal accolades at the club's Player of the Year awards for 2017–18, winning another award the season after. The team then won promotion to League One in 2018–19. At the PFA Scotland awards, he was shortlisted for Player of the Year and named in the Team of the Year for League Two for 2018–19.

Named club captain ahead of season 2019–20, Goodwillie became the first Clyde player to score five goals in a single match in 68 years and the first to score a hat-trick of penalties in one match. Both feats came in a 6–1 win over Stranraer. In April 2020, Goodwillie (with his 78th goal) moved in to the top ten of the club's all-time leading goalscorers.

With two goals in a 3–2 loss at Peterhead on 11 September 2021, Goodwillie achieved 100 goals for Clyde.

Raith Rovers
Goodwillie rejoined Scottish Championship club Raith Rovers in January 2022. The move caused controversy due to Goodwillie's civil responsibility for rape.  Two club directors, several staff members, the women's team captain and most club volunteers resigned and shirt sponsor Val McDermid withdrew her support of the club due to the signing, which was also criticised by First Minister Nicola Sturgeon and former Prime Minister Gordon Brown. The women's team cut ties with Raith Rovers. A few days after signing Goodwillie, Raith Rovers said he would not be selected to play for the club and that discussions would be held over his contract. 

On 1 March 2022, Goodwillie was loaned back to former club Clyde for the remainder of the 2021–22 season. After the club's women's team resigned en masse and North Lanarkshire Council announced that their lease on Broadwood Stadium would be terminated early if Goodwillie was allowed entry, Clyde cancelled the loan deal and returned him to Raith. Goodwillie was released from his Raith Rovers contract on 30 September 2022.

Later career
Goodwillie played one game for Livingston United as a trialist, scoring twice in a 3–1 victory over Fauldhouse United. Following media and public disapproval, Livingston United announced that Goodwillie would not train or play with the club again.

On 7 February 2023, Goodwillie played for Northern Premier League club Radcliffe, who had not announced his signing before his appearance. He scored a hat-trick in a 4–2 win against Belper Town. A day later, Radcliffe announced that Goodwillie had left the club and admitted they had made a "significant misstep" in signing him.

International career
Goodwillie made his debut for the Scotland national under-21 football team in November 2008. He received his first call-up for the senior side in November 2010 for a friendly against the Faroe Islands. He made his debut in that match, coming on as a 76th-minute substitute for Kris Commons.

His international career stalled after that, however, because the SFA were reluctant to select Goodwillie while he underwent a legal process. Goodwillie was charged with sexual assault, but the case did not proceed to trial due to there being insufficient evidence to prove the allegation. After it was announced that Goodwillie would not be prosecuted, Scotland manager Craig Levein recalled Goodwillie to the national squad.

He scored his first goal for Scotland on 11 October 2011, from a penalty kick in a 3–1 defeat against World Cup holders Spain. Goodwillie scored with his first touch of the ball after coming on as a substitute. Later in the same game, Goodwillie missed a glaring opportunity, as he shot wide of the goal instead of setting up the unmarked Craig Mackail-Smith.

Criminal convictions and rape judgment
In June 2008, Goodwillie was convicted of assaulting a man in a Stirling nightclub, and was fined £250.

In September 2009 Goodwillie was arrested after a nightclub doorman was knocked unconscious. Two months later, Goodwillie was convicted of assault and received a £200 fine.

In 2012, Goodwillie was convicted of assault for repeatedly punching and kicking John Friel after Friel attacked Goodwillie's teammate Danny Swanson from behind at a takeaway in Glasgow in 2010. He was sentenced to a 12-month probation order and to carry out 80 hours of unpaid work. Friel was ordered to carry out 240 hours of unpaid work for his part in the incident.

Rape
Goodwillie and his teammate David Robertson were accused of raping a woman in January 2011. Goodwillie was charged with rape, but the Crown Office did not pursue a criminal prosecution due to insufficient evidence in law. The Criminal Injuries Compensation Authority determined that the woman had been raped and awarded her £11,000.

The woman took civil action in 2016 against Goodwillie and Robertson, in the first case of its kind in Scotland. The judge ruled that they had each raped her, and ordered them to pay £100,000 in compensation. The civil case was judged on the balance of probabilities and did not need corroboration of evidence, unlike in a Scottish criminal case. Soon after the case concluded Goodwillie left his club, Plymouth Argyle, while Robertson retired from football. Goodwillie had asked to leave Plymouth as he was considering an appeal. In November 2017 three appeal judges at the Court of Session upheld the ruling against Goodwillie and Robertson. Goodwillie and Robertson both declared bankruptcy and have not paid the compensation.

Career statistics

Club

International
Scores and results list Scotland's goal tally first, score column indicates score after each Goodwillie goal.

Honours
Dundee United
Scottish Cup: 2009–10

Clyde
Scottish League One Play-Offs: 2018–19

Individual
Scottish PFA Young Player of the Year: 2011
Scottish FWA Young Player of the Year: 2011
SPL Player of the Month: March 2011

References

External links
 
 

1989 births
Living people
Footballers from Stirling
Scottish people convicted of assault
Scotland youth international footballers
Scotland under-21 international footballers
Scottish Premier League players
Scottish Football League players
Premier League players
English Football League players
Dundee United F.C. players
Raith Rovers F.C. players
Blackburn Rovers F.C. players
Crystal Palace F.C. players
Blackpool F.C. players
Plymouth Argyle F.C. players
Aberdeen F.C. players
Ross County F.C. players
Clyde F.C. players
Livingston United F.C. players
Association football forwards
Scotland international footballers
Scottish footballers
Scottish Professional Football League players
Rape in Scotland
Northern Premier League players
Radcliffe F.C. players